Pleurothallis ascera is a species of plant in the family Orchidaceae.

Distribution 
It is native to Colombia. It is found in the Andes around  1800 meters.

Description 
It is an epiphyte with stout, erect ramicauls enveloped tubular sheaths, and flower size of 2.5 centimeters.

Taxonomy 
It was named by Carlyle A. Luer and Rodrigo Escobar in: Orquideologia 20: 36. in 1996.

References 

ascera